Antony station (French: Gare d'Antony) is a station on the line B of the Réseau Express Régional, a hybrid suburban commuter and rapid transit line. It is named after the city of Antony, Hauts-de-Seine where the station is located. The station allows the transfer from the RER B to Orlyval, a small automated light rail shuttle service to Orly Airport.

History
 1937: Station built as part of Ligne de Sceaux
 1977: Station integrated in RER B
 2 October 1991: Opening of Orlyval

Gallery

References

See also

 List of stations of the Paris RER

Antony
Antony